George "Sjors" van Driem (born 1957) is a Dutch linguist associated with the University of Bern, where he was the chair of Historical Linguistics and directed the Linguistics Institute. He became professor emeritus in 2022.

Education 
 Leiden University, 1983–1987 (PhD, A Grammar of Limbu)
 Leiden University, 1981–1983 (MA Slavic, BA English, MA General Linguistics)
 Leiden University, 1979–1981 (BA Slavic)
 University of Virginia at Charlottesville, 1975–1979 (BA Biology)
 Katholieke Universiteit Nijmegen, 1978–1979
 Watling Island Marine Biological Station on San Salvador Island in the Bahamas, 1977
 Duke University at Durham, North Carolina, 1976

Research
George van Driem has conducted field research in the Himalayas since 1983. He was commissioned by the Royal Government of Bhutan to codify a grammar of Dzongkha, the national language, design a phonological romanisation for the language known as Roman Dzongkha, and complete a survey of the language communities of the kingdom. He and native Dzongkha speaker Karma Tshering co-authored the authoritative textbook on Dzongkha. Van Driem wrote grammars of Limbu and Dumi, Kiranti languages spoken in eastern Nepal, and the Bumthang language of central Bhutan. He authored Languages of the Himalayas, a two-volume ethnolinguistic handbook of the greater Himalayan region. Under a programme named Languages and Genes of the Greater Himalayan Region, conducted in collaboration with the Government of Nepal and the Royal Government of Bhutan, he collected DNA from many indigenous peoples of the Himalayas.

In Bern, George van Driem currently runs the research programme Strategische Zielsetzungen im Subkontinent (Strategic Objectives in the Subcontinent), which aims to analyse and describe endangered and poorly documented languages in South Asia. This programme of research is effectively a diversification of the Himalayan Languages Project, which he directed at Leiden University, where he held the chair of Descriptive Linguistics until 2009. He and his research team have documented over a dozen endangered languages of the greater Himalayan region, producing analytical grammars and lexica and recording morphologically analysed native texts. 

His interdisciplinary research in collaboration with geneticists has led to advances in the reconstruction of Asian ethnolinguistic prehistory. Based on linguistic palaeontology, ethnolinguistic phylogeography, rice genetics and the Holocene distribution of faunal species, he identified the ancient Hmong-Mien and Austroasiatics as the first domesticators of Asian rice and published a theory on the homelands and prehistoric dispersal of the Hmong-Mien, Austroasiatic and Trans-Himalayan linguistic phyla. His historical linguistic work on linguistic phylogeny has replaced the unsupported Sino-Tibetan hypothesis with the older, more agnostic Tibeto-Burman phylogenetic model, for which he proposed the neutral geographical name Trans-Himalayan in 2004. He developed the Darwinian theory of language known as Symbiosism, and he is author of the philosophy of Symbiomism.

Selected publications

Awards and honours
 1996 Rolex Awards for Enterprise for setting up the Himalayan Languages Project
 1998 Elected Honorary Member of the Kirat Yakthung Chumlung at Kathmandu

See also
Himalayan Languages Project
East Asian languages
Mahakiranti languages
Karasuk languages
Father Tongue hypothesis

References

External links
George Van Driem's home page at Himalayan Languages Project
Publication list

Linguists from the Netherlands
Linguists of Himalayan languages
Linguists of Southeast Asian languages
Leiden University alumni
Academic staff of Leiden University
Dzongkha language
1957 births
Living people
People from Northampton County, Virginia
Paleolinguists
Linguists of Sino-Tibetan languages
Academic staff of the University of Bern
20th-century linguists
21st-century linguists